Ayers Rock Airport (also known as Connellan Airport)  is situated near Yulara, around  (5 hrs drive) away from Alice Springs, Northern Territory, and 20 minutes drive from Uluru / Ayers Rock itself. An average of just under 300,000 passengers pass through this airport each year.

History

The original Connellan Airport at Uluru was provided by Edward Connellan, who founded Connellan Airways in 1942. The development of tourism infrastructure adjacent to the base of Uluru / Ayers Rock that began in the 1950s soon created adverse environmental impacts. It was decided in the early 1970s to remove all accommodation-related tourist facilities from near the base of Uluru / Ayers Rock and re-establish them outside the national park. The new facilities became fully operational in late 1984. The airport was featured in a 1998 episode of Tots TV called Airport. On 6 August 2000, an Ansett Australia Airbus A320 arrived from Auckland Airport in New Zealand, carrying the Sydney Olympic Torch for its inaugural Australian leg. From there, the torch was taken for a run around Uluru / Ayers Rock, followed by a formal reception. Virgin Australia at the time Virgin Blue announced in March 2010 that the airline would start flying to Uluru / Ayers Rock flights later commenced from Sydney in August 2010 which also marked the airline's first flight into the red centre operated by Embraer E-190s. In September 2020 Virgin Australia revealed it had dropped seven regional destinations with one of them being Uluru / Ayers Rock. Qantas then announced in February 2013 that Jetstar would take over Qantas mainline's Sydney service in April 2013. Jetstar later launched flights from Melbourne Airport in June 2014 and Brisbane Airport in August 2018. Qantas announced in November 2018 that Qantas mainline would return in April 2019 along with 2 news routes from Adelaide Airport and Darwin Airport, these flights haven't returned after being put on hold in 2020. In May 2021 Qantas revealed that the airline will resume its Sydney flights for the first time since April 2013 in March 2022. QantasLink also has flights from Cairns Airport and Alice Springs Airport.

Facilities
Ayers Rock Airport has one main terminal for scheduled flights. It has a simple, single stage lighting system and T-VASIS. The largest aircraft currently serving Ayers Rock Airport are Boeing 737-800 jetliners operated by Qantas and also previously by Virgin Australia. Jetstar currently operates Airbus A320 jetliners on its flights into the airport.

Airlines and destinations

See also
 List of airports in the Northern Territory

References

External links

Airports in the Northern Territory
Airports established in 1984
1984 establishments in Australia